Zhvania is a Georgian surname. Notable persons with that name include:

Anna Zhvania (born 1970), Georgian politician
Kakhaber Zhvania, (born 1983), Georgian boxer
Lasha Zhvania (born 1973), Georgian politician
Zurab Zhvania (1963–2005), Georgian politician
Zurab Zhvania (born 1991), Georgian rugby union player

Georgian-language surnames